Govindavadi is a small village near Kancheepuram temple town in Kancheepuram district in Tamil Nadu, India. Kancheepuram is about 100 km from Chennai and is also famous for its world famous silk sarees. It is also near Agaram.

Gurusthalam Temple

Govindavadi is locally known for the Gurusthalam temple, a shrine dedicated to the Hindu deity Dakshinamoorthy. It is said that Govinda Swamy Perumal along with his family was tutored the Vedas by Dakshinamoorthy at this Temple and hence the name.

Every Thursday is considered as a special occasion and devotees visit this temple in large numbers on that day. Guru preethi pooja may be done to overcome any issues/obstacles posed by the influence of planet Guru.

This is also the only exclusive shrine for Lord Dakshinamurthy. Normally in other shrines the Lord is in the southern side of the Main/presiding deity with no gopuram/Temple tower. However, at Govindavadi Temple the main presiding deity is Lord Dakshinamoorththy with other deities around.

With the blessings of Shri Shri Shri Maha Swamigal, the timber for Dhwaja Sthambham was contributed (Samarpanam) by Andukuri Adinarayana, Timber Merchants, Chennai in the year 1968.

References 

Hindu holy cities
Villages in Kanchipuram district